Chernyak, Czerniak, Czarniak, Cherniak or Cherniack is a gender-neutral Slavic surname. It is derived from čьrnъ ("black").

Czerniak and Czarniak are the Polish variants, with Czerniak being about six times more common.

People 
Alexey Chernyak (born 1973), Russian politician
Andrzej Czarniak (1931–1985), Polish alpine skier
Boris Cherniak (born 1964), Russian-born comedy hypnotist, motivational speaker, entertainer, author, illusionist and hypnotherapist
Christopher Cherniak, American philosophy academic
Evgeniy Chernyak (born 1969), Ukrainian businessman
Konrad Czerniak (born 1989), Polish swimmer 
Leah Cherniak (born 1956), Canadian playwright and theatre director 
Lindsay Czarniak (born 1977), American sports anchor and reporter 
Moshe Czerniak (1910–1984), Polish-Israeli chess master
Nathalie Sarraute (born Natalya Chernyak, 1900–1999), French lawyer and writer
Saul Cherniack (born 1917), Canadian lawyer and politician
Volodymyr Chernyak (1941–2021), Ukrainian politician
Włodzimierz Czarniak (1934–1964), Polish alpine skier
Yan Chernyak (1909–1995), World War II Soviet spy
Brothers Tim Czerniak and Elis Czerniak of Halves (band)

References

See also
 
 

Russian-language surnames
Ukrainian-language surnames
Polish-language surnames